"Be Nice" is a song by hip-hop group Black Eyed Peas featuring Snoop Dogg. It marked the first collaboration between the two. Lyrically, the song is about coming together, no matter what our differences might be. The song is derived from Songland.

References

2019 singles
Black Eyed Peas songs
2019 songs
Songs written by Snoop Dogg
Songs written by will.i.am
Songs written by Ester Dean
Songs written by Ryan Tedder
Songs written by Shane McAnally